Rejection Therapy is a social self-help game created by Jason Comely where being rejected by another person or group is the sole winning condition. The player can attempt any kind of social rejection, or try a suggestion from one of the Rejection Therapy suggestion cards available. The game can be played for any length of time, although many undertake the 30 Day Challenge.

The purpose of playing the game is to overcome the fear of rejection through controlled, forced exposure. By this means, players hope to adapt physically to the stresses of rejection.

Gameplay

Rules 
There is only one official rule to Rejection Therapy, which is to be rejected by another person at least once, every day. There are also stipulations as to what counts as a rejection and what does not:
 A rejection counts if you are out of your comfort zone
 A rejection counts if your request is denied
 At the time of rejection, the player, not the respondent, should be in a position of vulnerability. The player should be sensitive to the feelings of the person being asked.

Strategies 
Some players develop strategies and coping mechanisms for managing the fear before a rejection attempt, such as mindfulness or using the three second rule. New players are advised to start with small rejections before graduating to more emotionally and socially meaningful rejections.

Psychology 
Rejection Therapy share components with exposure therapy and emotional tolerance training – both evidence based treatment modalities within the CBT framework. The game resembles many of the behaviour changing techniques that constitutes modern psychotherapy, with the playful "gamification" being an added feature.

References

External links 
 Rejection Therapy

Dedicated deck card games
Self-care